Farnley Hall Park is a park in Farnley, Leeds, England, approximately four miles from the city centre. 16 hectares in size, it lies in the grounds of Farnley Hall and hosts the main base of Leeds City Parks.

The park's attractions include areas of open grassland, natural woodland, formal gardens, a children's playground and football and rugby pitches

References 

Parks and commons in Leeds